Thinkful is an online interactive platform that offers a variety of online coding bootcamps in several areas including web development, mobile development, and design.

History 
Bloc was founded in February 2012 by Roshan Choxi and Dave Paola. They met at the University of Illinois at Urbana-Champaign in 2008, before moving to San Francisco where the company is currently headquartered. Subsequently, Paola and Choxi began tutoring students over Skype in 2012, then later introduced Bloc at the Launch Festival in San Francisco. The company raised $250,000 in seed funding in May 2012, another $2 million in December 2013, and $6 million in Series A funding in November 2014.

In April 2018, Bloc was acquired by online bootcamp Thinkful for an undisclosed sum. Officials at Thinkful said Bloc was not profitable and "almost breaking even" at the time the deal closed.

Scholarships 
Bloc offers two scholarships: the New Relic Diversity Scholarship in Software Development and Design, and the Veterans Scholarship in Software Development and Design. Both scholarships are offered to U.S. military veterans, and the New Relic Diversity Scholarship is offered to minorities.

See also 
 Coursera
 The Data Incubator
 Codecademy
 Khan Academy
 Lynda.com
 App Academy
 Chegg

References

American educational websites